Harry Mart Maskrey (8 October 1880 – 21 April 1927) was an English footballer who played at both professional and international levels as a goalkeeper.

Personal life

Maskrey was born in Dronfield and died in Derby.

Career

Club career
Maskrey played club football for Ripley Athletic, Derby County, Bradford City, Ripley Town, Stalybridge Celtic, Mansfield Mechanics, British Cellulose and Burton All Saints.

International career
Maskrey earned one cap for the England national side in 1908.

External links

Bygone Derbyshire

1880 births
1927 deaths
English footballers
England international footballers
Derby County F.C. players
Bradford City A.F.C. players
Ripley Town F.C. players
Stalybridge Celtic F.C. players
Mansfield Mechanics F.C. players
Burton Town F.C. players
English Football League players
English Football League representative players
Association football goalkeepers